LaVar Walker is an American comedian and writer. In August 2012, after winning the regional competition for the "Stand up its Miller Time" national comedy championship, he won the final competition in Las Vegas, which came with a $10,000 prize. He is currently touring with the Shaquille O'Neal All Star Comedy Jam with shows in cities across the country.

Celebrities are touting LaVar's comedy talents. On October 20th, 2012, a YouTube video was posted where Shaquille O'Neal says: "LaVar is funnier than a mother. You know what I'm talking about. Check him out on YouTube." In a Chicago Sun-Times article from March 6, 2013, comedian Kevin Hart said: "Remember the name Lavar Walker because I want to be able to say, 'I told you so!' The guy is a legitimate comedic star."

Walker was born on the south side of Chicago and earned a doctoral degree in pharmacy from Xavier University in New Orleans. He has appeared on Uptown Comic, The Mo'Nique Show, and BET's ComicView. He also has a writing credit for his appearance on BET's ComicView. His YouTube video featuring an impression of rapper TI has more than 1.6 million hits.

Despite his string of successes and growing popularity, LaVar remains humble. He told the Chicago Sun-Times that he just wants to be happy in what he is doing. "To be honest with you, I just want to be happy doing what I do and make a great living doing it. Does that sound crazy? If you get right down to it," he says, "looking back on everything I've done to this point, I think I made it. I'm the biggest star in the world to me."

Sun-Times reporter Mike Thomas called this attitude: "Pretty sane actually."

In 2014, Walker was allegedly beaten up by comedian Mike Epps and two unidentified men. After recording a video spoofing a purported feud with Kevin Hart, Walker was confronted, punched, and kicked in the face by Epps. Walker was hospitalized for a contusion on the head and other facial and body bruises.

Notes

References 

 "PROMO: The 'Stand Up, It’s Miller Time' Comedy Competition Final Will Stream Online". Complex Magazine. Retrieved January 18, 2013. 
 "Comedian Lavar Walker Joins The Shaq Comedy All Star Tour!" Humor Mill Magazine Retrieved January 18, 2013.
 YouTube. Retrieved January 18, 2013.
 Bio. Lavar Walker.net. Retrieved January 18, 2013.
 Gardenswartz, Noah. "ATL Comic Profile: Lavar Walker". Creative Loafing Atlanta. Retrieved January 18, 2013.
 "Lavar Walker". IMDb. Retrieved January 18, 2013.
 "Comedian LaVar Walker Leaves Pharmacy Behind Thanks to Kevin Hart". Chicago Sun Times. March 6, 2013.

American male comedians
Writers from Chicago
Xavier University of Louisiana alumni
20th-century births
Year of birth missing (living people)
Living people
Comedians from Illinois